Brother's Justice (The Attempted Making of) is a 2010 comedy film written by Dax Shepard. The film is a satirical mockumentary about Dax Shepard's transformation from comedian to a silver screen martial arts star. Shepard exploits any and all Hollywood connections on his quest to become the next Chuck Norris. The film represents the Hollywood film producing process.

The film won an Austin Film Festival award.

Cast
Dax Shepard
Nate Tuck
Ashton Kutcher
Tom Arnold
Bradley Cooper
David Koechner
Jon Favreau
Ryan Hansen
Seth Green

Release
On October 26, 2010, Dax Shepard had released a trailer for his film Brother's Justice.

Reception
On review aggregator website Rotten Tomatoes, the film has an approval rating of 0% based on reviews from 9 critics, with an average rating of 3.4/10. On Metacritic, the film has a weighted average score of 22 out of 100, based on 7 critics, indicating "generally unfavorable reviews".

Dennis Harvey of Variety wrote "It's an easy watch that nonetheless consistently feels like a grazing blow rather than a knockout". Nick Schager of Slant Magazine added his criticism of the film, stating "Dax Shepard delivers an I'm Still Here-style mockumentary of staggering incompetence with Brother's Justice".

Eric Hynes of Time Out gave the film 1 star out of 5, while Andy Webster of The New York Times called the film "[an] ultralow-budget".

The Village Voices Aaron Hillis compared Brother's Justice to an overlong episode of Curb Your Enthusiasm, adding that unlike that show "[this film has] none of the wit and [is] twice [as] irritati[ng]".

According to Gary Goldstein of the Los Angeles Times "[It's b]etter to revisit such memorable Hollywood satires as The Big Picture or For Your Consideration before indulging Shepard's uninspired whimsy".

Awards
2010 Austin Film Festival Audience Award Winner: Comedy Vanguard

References

External links

2010s mockumentary films
American mockumentary films
Films directed by Dax Shepard
2010 comedy films
2010 directorial debut films
2010 films
2010s English-language films
2010s American films